The 2022 season for  is the 20th season in the team's existence. The team has been a UCI WorldTeam since 2005, when the tier was first established. Long-time sponsor Quick-Step Flooring, which has been a title sponsor since the team's formation in 2003, continues its sponsorship, while Deceuninck ends its sponsorship after three years. In its place, the team will take on the name of one of Quick-Step's sub-brands, Alpha Vinyl. They use Specialized bicycles, Shimano drivetrain, Roval wheels and Vermarc clothing. 

The team are the UCI World Team Ranking champions, having won it for the third time in the past four seasons.

Team roster 

Riders who joined the team for the 2022 season

Riders who left the team during or after the 2021 season

Season victories

National, Continental, and World Champions

Notes

References

External links 

 

Quick-Step Alpha Vinyl Team
2022
Quick-Step Alpha Vinyl Team